Kevin Closs (born 1963) is a Canadian singer-songwriter, and author ("OMAGEE") Closs was raised on Manitoulin Island, and currently lives in the Onaping Falls neighbourhood of Sudbury. An independent recording artist since 1989, he works both as a solo performer and with his rock band The Nobs.

Closs is best known for his song "Erica", a Canadian Top 40 hit in 1994 as well as his guitar arrangement of "O Canada" played as the daystarter on CBC Northern Ontario Radio. He has also toured as a supporting musician in Charlie Major's band. He won Northern Lights Festival Boréal's Jackie Washington Award in 2002 and the Mayor's Celebration of the Arts Award for Lifetime Achievement in the Arts in 2016.

Closs teaches songwriting workshops in schools across Northern Ontario through "Learning Through the Arts" and through invitations from Arts organizations. He has performed in Theatre and Film productions as both actor and musician.

Kevin has performed at festivals across Canada and performs his music on board ships in the Arctic Circle and Antarctica.

Discography

Solo

Albums

Singles

The Nobs

Albums

References

External links
 

1963 births
Canadian folk singer-songwriters
Canadian male singer-songwriters
Canadian country singer-songwriters
Living people
People from Manitoulin District
Musicians from Greater Sudbury
Musicians from Sault Ste. Marie, Ontario